Furhgill Alcino Glenn Zeldenrust (born 21 July 1989) is a Dutch footballer who plays for Tweede Divisie club Rijnsburgse Boys. He formerly played for VV Zwaluwen, Texas Dutch Lions, RKC Waalwijk, FC Den Bosch, Dynamo Dresden and Helmond Sport.

References

External links
 Voetbal International profile 

1989 births
Living people
Dutch footballers
Sportspeople from Paramaribo
Association football forwards
RKC Waalwijk players
FC Den Bosch players
Dynamo Dresden players
Helmond Sport players
Rijnsburgse Boys players
Eredivisie players
Eerste Divisie players
Tweede Divisie players
3. Liga players
VV Zwaluwen players
Houston Dutch Lions players
RVVH players
Dutch expatriate footballers
Dutch expatriate sportspeople in the United States
Dutch expatriate sportspeople in Germany
USL League Two players
Expatriate soccer players in the United States
Expatriate footballers in Germany